An ethicist is one whose judgment on ethics and ethical codes has come to be trusted by a specific community, and (importantly) is expressed in some way that makes it possible for others to mimic or approximate that judgment. Following the advice of ethicists is one means of acquiring knowledge about what that ethicist says (see argument, argument from authority).

The term jurist describes an ethicist whose judgment on law becomes part of a legal code, or otherwise has force of law.  This may be due to formal (de jure) state sanction.

Some jurists have less formal (de facto) backing by an ethical community, e.g. a religious community.  In Islamic Law, for instance, such a community following (taqlid) a specific jurisprudence (fiqh) of shariah mimics judgment of a prior jurist.  Catholic Canon Law has a similar structure.  Such a jurist may be a theologian or simply a prominent teacher.  To those outside this tradition, the jurist is simply an ethicist who they may more freely disagree with, and whose input on any issue is advisory.  However, they may find it hard to avoid a fatwa or excommunication or other such shunning by the religious community, so it may be hard advice to ignore.

Other meanings

"Ethicist" may also mean a person who subscribes to ethicism, which can be defined either as a philosophy based on ethics or "the view that a work of art's moral point of view affects the work's overall aesthetic evaluation". "Ethicist" may also mean a person with a tendency to moralize.

See also
 List of ethicists, demonstrates the extreme range of people who claim to have made, or contributed to, ethical debates.

Notes